M'rirt is a town in Khénifra Province, Béni Mellal-Khénifra, Morocco. According to the 2004 Moroccan census, it had a population of 35,196.

Notable people  

 Younes Abouyaaqoub and Houssaine Abouyaaqoub: terrorists responsible for the 2017 Cataluña terrorist attacks

References

Populated places in Khénifra Province